Čaradice is a village and municipality in Zlaté Moravce District of the Nitra Region, in western-central Slovakia.

History
In historical records the village was first mentioned in 1209.

Geography
The municipality lies at an altitude of 240 metres and covers an area of 17.85 km². It has a population of about 520 people.

Genealogical resources

The records for genealogical research are available at the state archive "Statny Archiv in Nitra, Slovakia"

 Roman Catholic church records (births/marriages/deaths): 1742-1894 (parish B)

See also
 List of municipalities and towns in Slovakia

References

External links
http://www.statistics.sk/mosmis/eng/run.html
Surnames of living people in Caradice

Villages and municipalities in Zlaté Moravce District